Andrei Aleksandrovich Bychkov (born 13 July 1988) is a Russian professional football player. He plays for FC Kosmos Dolgoprudny.

Club career
He made his Russian Football National League debut for FC Dynamo Saint Petersburg on 8 July 2017 in a game against FC Yenisey Krasnoyarsk.

External links
 
 

1988 births
Footballers from Moscow
Living people
Russian footballers
Association football defenders
FC Dynamo Moscow reserves players
FC Gornyak Uchaly players
FC Salyut Belgorod players
FC Dynamo Saint Petersburg players
PFC Sochi players
FC Tom Tomsk players
FC Chayka Peschanokopskoye players
FC Olimp-Dolgoprudny players